In mathematics, the Rees matrix semigroups are a special class of semigroups introduced by David Rees in 1940. They are of fundamental importance in semigroup theory because they are used to classify certain classes of simple semigroups.

Definition 

Let S be a semigroup, I and Λ non-empty sets and P a matrix indexed by I and Λ with entries pi,λ taken from S.
Then the Rees matrix semigroup M(S; I, Λ; P) is the set I×S×Λ together with the multiplication

(i, s, λ)(j, t, μ) = (i, spλ,j t, μ).

Rees matrix semigroups are an important technique for building new semigroups out of old ones.

Rees' theorem 

In his 1940 paper Rees proved the following theorem characterising completely simple semigroups: 

That is, every completely simple semigroup is isomorphic to a semigroup of the form M(G; I, Λ; P) for some group G. Moreover, Rees proved that if G is a group and G0 is the semigroup obtained from G by attaching a  zero element, then M(G0; I, Λ; P) is a regular semigroup if and only if every row and column of the matrix P contains an element that is not 0. If such an M(G0; I, Λ; P) is regular, then it is also completely 0-simple.

See also 

 Semigroup
 Completely simple semigroup
 David Rees (mathematician)

References 

.
.

Semigroup theory